Antonino "Nino" D'Agata (8 October 1955 – 20 August 2021) was an Italian film and television actor, and a voice actor in the Italian version of The Simpsons.

Filmography
 Giovanni Falcone (1993)
 Rapporti impropri (1999)
 L'ultimo bacio (2001)
 Prima classe (2003)
 Le conseguenze dell'amore (2004)
 Non vi sedete troppo (2005)
 Mai dove dovremmo essere (2005)
 Nuovomondo (2006)
 Il sangue dei vinti (2008)
 Nero infinito (2013)
 La trattativa (2014)
 Il ministro (2016)

References

External links

1955 births
2021 deaths
Actors from Catania
Italian male film actors
Italian male voice actors
Italian male television actors
20th-century Italian male actors
21st-century Italian male actors